Maronite Eparchy of Our Lady of Lebanon (in Latin: Eparchia Dominae Nostrae Libanensis in civitate Angelorum in California Maronitarum), headquartered in St. Louis, Missouri, is an entity pertaining to the Apostolic Maronite Patriarchal Church of Antioch and  includes the Maronite faithful in the western and central United States.  In conformity with the Code of Canons of the Eastern Churches (CCEO), the Eparchy is under the direct jurisdiction of the Roman Pontiff. In 2013 there were 52,300 baptized. It is currently ruled by eparch Abdallah Elias Zaidan, MLM.

Territory and statistics
The eparchy includes the faithful of the Maronite Church in thirty-four western, central and southern states of the United States of America. With a decree from the Sacred Congregation of the Eastern Churches, dated July 10, 2001, the see of the Eparchy of Our Lady of Lebanon was transferred to St. Louis, Missouri, with St. Raymond Church, in St. Louis, elevated to the rank of Co-Cathedral., as of 9 Sep 2011, the history quoted here was a verbatim copy of the history page of the Eparchy website. Its see cathedral is Our Lady of Mt. Lebanon-St. Peter Cathedral in Los Angeles.

Its territory is divided into 35 parishes and in 2013 had 52,300 American Maronites.

History
Immigration of Maronite Christianity from Greater Syria to the United States began during the latter part of the nineteenth century. When they were able to obtain a priest, communities were established under the jurisdiction of the local Latin Bishops.

Pope Paul VI, with the Apostolic Constitution Cum supremi of January 10, 1966, established the Maronite Apostolic Exarchate for the Maronite faithful of the United States. Francis Mansour Zayek was appointed the first bishop in a decree of the Sacred Congregation for the Eastern Churches dated January 27, 1966. The See city was Detroit, Michigan, with a Cathedral under the patronage of St Maron. At that time, the Exarchate was a suffragan of the Archdiocese of Detroit.

On November 29, 1971, Pope Paul VI, with the Apostolic Constitution Quae spes, the Exarchate was elevated to the status of an Eparchy, with the name of Eparchy of St. Maron of Detroit. With a decree from the Sacred Congregation of the Eastern Churches dated June 27, 1977, the see of the Eparchy of St. Maron was transferred to Brooklyn, New York, with the cathedral under the patronage of Our Lady of Lebanon. The name of the Eparchy was modified to Eparchy of St. Maron of Brooklyn. On December 10, 1982, Pope John Paul II accorded the title of "Archbishop ad personam" to Bishop Zayek as recognition of his personal contributions to the Catholic Church.

With the papal bull Omnium Catholicorum promulgated on 19 February 1994, Pope John Paul II erected the Eparchy of Our Lady of Lebanon of Los Angeles, came from the Maronite Catholic Eparchy of St. Maron of Brooklyn as a second eparchy for Maronite Catholics in the United States, with the territory of thirty-four (34) states - Ohio, West Virginia, Illinois, Alabama, Michigan, Minnesota, Missouri, Texas, Utah, Arizona, Nevada, Oregon, California, Alaska, Hawaii, Indiana, Kentucky, Tennessee, Mississippi, Wisconsin, Iowa, Arkansas, Louisiana, North Dakota, South Dakota, Kansas, Oklahoma, Nebraska, Montana, Wyoming, Colorado, New Mexico, Idaho and Washington.  The pope appointed John George Chedid, formerly Titular Bishop of Callinicum for the Maronites and Auxiliary of the Eparchy of St Maron, as the first eparch with the Cathedral under the patronage of Our Lady of Mt. Lebanon. by Archbishop Francis Mansour Zayek, representing the Maronite Patriarch Nasrallah Boutros Sfeir, enthroned  Bishop Chedid on the 24th of June of that year.

On December 5, 2000, the Pope accepted the resignation of Bishop John Chedid due to canonical age, and appointed Chorbishop Robert Joseph Shaheen to the see. Bishop Shaheen was ordained and installed Eparch on February 15, 2001, by Patriarch Nasrallah Peter Sfeir in the Cathedral Basilica of the Archdiocese of Saint Louis, Missouri.  Soon after, the Congregation for the Oriental Churches approved the relocation of the eparchy's offices to St. Louis and the elevation of the Church of St. Raphael to the co-cathedral of the eparchy.

On July 10, 2013, Pope Francis accepted the resignation of Bishop Robert J. Shaheen and appointed the Abdallah Elias Zaidan as the new bishop of the Eparchy of Our Lady of Lebanon. Zaidan was ordained as a bishop on September 28, 2013, at the National Shrine of the Basilica Of Our Lady of Lebanon, Mount Harissa, Lebanon, by Cardinal Bechara Peter Rai, Patriarch of Antioch and all the East, and installed as bishop of the Eparchy on October 23, 2013, at St. Raymond's Co-Cathedral in St. Louis, Missouri.

Parishes and missions
Note: Maronites who do not reside within a convenient distance to a local Maronite church attend other Catholic churches, but retain their membership in the Maronite Church.

The territory of the Eparchy of Our Lady of Lebanon comprises the following states, parishes and missions:

Alabama
Saint Elias Maronite Church (Birmingham)

Arizona
Saint Joseph Maronite Church (Phoenix)

California
Saint John Maron Maronite Church (Anaheim)
Our Lady of the Rosary Mission (Carmichael)
Our Lady of Lebanon-St Peter Maronite Cathedral (Los Angeles)
Our Lady of Lebanon Maronite Church (Millbrae)
Saint Joseph Maronite Mission (Riverside)
Saint Ephrem Maronite Church (San Diego)
Saint Sharbel Mission (Stockton)
Saint Jude Maronite Mission (West Covina)
Saints Peter and Paul Maronite Mission (San Fernando Valley)

Colorado
Saint Rafka Maronite Church (Denver)

Illinois
Our Lady of Lebanon Maronite Church (Lombard)
Saint Sharbel Maronite Church (Peoria)

Louisiana
Saint Sharbel Maronite Mission (Baton Rouge)

Michigan
Saint Maron Maronite Church (Detroit)
Our Lady of Lebanon Maronite Church (Flint)
Saint Rafka Maronite Mission (Livonia)
Saint Sharbel Maronite Church (Clinton Township)

Minnesota
Saint Maron Maronite Church (Minneapolis)
Holy Family Maronite Church (Mendota Heights)

Missouri
Saint Raymond Maronite Cathedral (Saint Louis)

Nevada
Saint Sharbel Maronite Mission (Las Vegas)

Ohio
Saint Anthony of Padua Maronite Church (Cincinnati)
Saint Maron Maronite Church (Cleveland)
Our Lady of Lebanon Maronite Mission (Columbus)
Saint Ignatius of Antioch Maronite Church (Dayton)
Our Lady of the Cedars of Mt. Lebanon Maronite Church (Fairlawn)
Basilica and National Shrine of Our Lady of Lebanon (North Jackson, Ohio)
Saint Maron Maronite Church (Youngstown)

Oklahoma
Our Lady of Lebanon Maronite Mission (Norman)
Saint Therese Maronite Church (Tulsa)

Oregon
Saint Sharbel Maronite Church (Portland)

Texas
Our Lady’s Maronite Church (Austin)
Saint Sharbel Maronite Church (El Paso)
Our Lady of Cedars Maronite Church (Houston)
Our Lady of Lebanon Maronite Church (Lewisville)
Saint George Maronite Church (San Antonio)

Utah
Saint Jude Maronite Church (Murray)

Wisconsin
Maronite Mission of Milwaukee (Sturtevant)

West Virginia
Our Lady of Lebanon Maronite Church (Wheeling)

Other communities
The Eparchy of Our Lady of Lebanon also has under its jurisdiction two monasteries:

Michigan

Maronite Order of the Blessed Virgin Mary (Ann Arbor)

Oregon

Monks of Jesus, Mary and Joseph (Beaverton/Portland)

Eparchs
John George Chedid † (February 19, 1994 – November 20, 2000) Retired
Robert Joseph Shaheen † (December 5, 2000 – July 10, 2013) Retired
Abdallah Elias Zaidan, MLM (since July 10, 2013)

Other priest of this eparchy who became bishop
 Gregory John Mansour, appointed Bishop of Saint Maron of Brooklyn (Maronite) in 2004

See also

Maronite Eparchy of Saint Maron of Brooklyn

References

External links
Maronite Eparchy of Our Lady of Lebanon of Los Angeles Official Site
stmaron.org
catholic-hierarchy.org

Lebanese-American culture in California
Eastern Catholicism in California
Religion in Los Angeles
Maronite Church in the United States
Our Lady
Our Lady Of Lebanon
Eastern Catholicism in Missouri
Our Lady Of Lebanon
Our Lady Of Lebanon
1994 establishments in California